The Siemens SX1 is a GSM mobile phone running version 1.2 of the Series 60 platform for the Symbian OS. It was the first such smartphone from Siemens following its licensing agreement with Nokia for the use and development of Series 60. Though unveiled in February 2003, it was not launched until December of that year.

Features 
The phone has a very high feature list for its time of release. It had three built in games and support for more by downloads. The three games which were bundled with the phone were Mozzies, which was awarded the title of best mobile game in 2003, Typegun, which was a game made for acquainting users to the keypad layout, and Sitris, a Tetris version with multiplayer support (via Bluetooth). In Mozzies, the Camera is used to detect the motion. So you have to position the gun on the flying mosquitoes which are superimposed on the video feed from the camera. The objective is to shoot down the mosquitoes by moving the phone around and clicking when you are aiming correctly.

The phone also has a good number of connectivity options from Bluetooth to IrDA. It can also be used as a Fax Machine by connecting it to an appropriate device like a computer through the software provided. The File Manager allows sending and receiving of various files over either infrared or bluetooth. The phone has two shortcut keys on its side. One is used to start the camera and click pictures, while the other can be used to make a voice command driven call or start the voice memo. There is a built in picture editor which allows modification of images taken by the camera or any other type of image present on the phone. The phone has a few organizer capabilities. There are applications to take down short notes, a To-Do List, a scheduler application with reminders  and a converter to convert currency and different measuring units.

The mobile has been popular because of a Linux port to this mobile called "Linux  on SX1".

Linux on SX1
A Linux for  the mobile exists, one can boot a modified Linux kernel  on the mobile using Das U-Boot as a bootloader. There  have been successful attempts to get Qtopia working on the mobile.

External links 
 The Symbian OS

Smartphones
SX1
Symbian devices
Mobile phones introduced in 2003
Mobile phones with infrared transmitter